Patrekur Jóhannesson (born 7 July 1972) is an Icelandic former handball player, who played for the Icelandic national handball team and competed in the 1992 Summer Olympics.

After he stopped playing handball professionally he embarked on a coaching career. In November 2011 Patrekur was appointed head coach for the Austrian national handball team.

Family
Patrekur is son of the teacher and journalist Margrét Thorlacius and the PE teacher and coach Jóhannes Sæmundsson. His father died of cancer at the age of 42. He is the brother of the historian and current President of Iceland Guðni Th. Jóhannesson, and of Jóhannes, who is a system analyst. His son is a popular rapper in Iceland, called JóiPé.

References

External links

1972 births
Living people
Patrekur Johannesson
Patrekur Johannesson
Patrekur Johannesson
Handball players at the 1992 Summer Olympics
Patrekur Johannesson
Expatriate handball players
Patrekur Johannesson
Handball-Bundesliga players
Patrekur Johannesson
Patrekur Johannesson
Patrekur Johannesson
Liga ASOBAL players
Patrekur Johannesson